"Getting to the Point" is a song by the rock group Electric Light Orchestra (ELO) from their 1986 album Balance of Power. Released in the UK as the last single from the album in July 1986, it was the last original release from the band for 15 years.

Overview 
Due to a strike on Epic's distribution department at the time of its release, the single did not make much of an impression on the singles chart. It peaked at number 95 in the UK. There was no release in the rest of Europe.

The lyrics reflect Lynne's feeling trapped by the "ELO machine" at the time.  Lynne described how he came up with the lyrics:

ELO writer Barry Delve describes the song as ELO's "last great song" that is "an expertly crafted power ballad that also boasts one of Jeff Lynne's finest vocal performances."

The B-Side of this single is the 1986 Balance of Power album-track "Secret Lives". It was meant to be a separate single outtake as labelled on the Balance of Power album cover (Dutch pressings with JET or EPIC Label Catno. 26467).

There was also a UK 12 inch Epic 3 track version with the "ELO Megamix" on the B-side. The mix featured the songs from A New World Record, Out of the Blue, Discovery, Time and Balance of Power. It was mixed by Paul Dakeyne for DMC.

Track listing
All songs written by Jeff Lynne.

7-inch single
"Getting to the Point" – 4:28
"Secret Lives" – 3:26

12-inch single
"Getting to the Point" – 4:28
"ELO Megamix" ("Don't Bring Me Down/Sweet Talkin' Woman/Livin' Thing/Calling America/So Serious/Shine a Little Love/Twilight/Turn to Stone/Hold on Tight") – 9:57
"Secret Lives" – 3:26

Chart positions

References

1980s ballads
1986 singles
1986 songs
British soft rock songs
Electric Light Orchestra songs
Rock ballads
Song recordings produced by Jeff Lynne
Songs written by Jeff Lynne